A Rest of the World cricket team captained by Gary Sobers toured Australia in the 1971–72 season. It replaced the proposed Test tour by South Africa which the Australian Cricket Board cancelled in 1971.

The World XI played 16 matches between early November 1971 and early February 1972. There were five matches against Australia which were regarded as official test matches in Wisden however the status was later withdrawn. The World XI won this series 2-1. The team also played three limited overs internationals against Australia and the remaining games were first-class fixtures against Australian state teams.

World XI would not play in Australia again until World Series Cricket in the late 1970s.

The team

"Test" series summary

First match

Second match

Third match

Fourth match

Fifth match

Matches

References

External links
 World XI in Australia, Nov 1971/Feb 1972 at Cricinfo
 World XI in Australia 1971-72 at CricketArchive

1971 in Australian cricket
1971–72 Australian cricket season
1972 in Australian cricket
Cricket and apartheid
International cricket competitions from 1970–71 to 1975
Multi-national cricket tours of Australia